Luis Alfredo López Flores (born 29 August 1986) is a Honduran football forward.

Club career
López played for Platense and moved to Marathón, making his debut against Broncos UNAH scoring 2 goals, and his next match against Olimpia in the Clasico Nacional Hondureño he scored the only and winning goal. He played for hometown club Hispano in the 2008 Apertura, after initially rejecting their offer.

Spells abroad
He was announced as member of Alacranes de Durango on 17 December 2008. On 12 October 2009 he signed a one-year contract with Bulgarian football club Botev Plovdiv, but after limited appearances with the Bulgarian side he returned to Marathón during the January 2010 transfer window. In summer 2010, he returned to Europe this time to play with Serbian outfit FK Srem. At the beginning of 2011 López agreed terms with FK Novi Pazar, another Serbian First League club, however he left before making any league appearance.

On 29 April 2011 Motagua announced its agreement with López for one year.

In June 2012 he joined Guatemalan side Juventud Escuintleca of the Guatemalan National League.

International career
López was part of the U-23 Honduras national football team that won the 2008 CONCACAF Men's Pre-Olympic Tournament. He also played in the 2008 Summer Olympics.

He earned his first cap with Honduras in a 1–0 victory over Grenada of Gold Cup on 11 July 2009.

References

External links

 

1986 births
Living people
People from Comayagua Department
Association football forwards
Honduran footballers
Honduras international footballers
Olympic footballers of Honduras
Footballers at the 2008 Summer Olympics
2009 CONCACAF Gold Cup players
C.D. Marathón players
Platense F.C. players
Hispano players
Botev Plovdiv players
FK Srem players
FK Novi Pazar players
Serbian First League players
F.C. Motagua players
Liga Nacional de Fútbol Profesional de Honduras players
Honduran expatriate footballers
Expatriate footballers in Mexico
Expatriate footballers in Bulgaria
Expatriate footballers in Serbia
Expatriate footballers in Guatemala